The 1999 Flanders Women's Open was a women's tennis tournament played on outdoor clay courts in Antwerp, Belgium that was part of the Tier IV category of the 1999 WTA Tour. It was the sixth edition of the tournament and was held from 10 May until 16 May 1999. Unseeded Justine Henin, who entered on a wildcard, won the singles title and the accompanying $16,000 first-prize money.

Finals

Singles

 Justine Henin defeated  Sarah Pitkowski, 6–1, 6–2
 This was future World No. 1 Henin's first WTA title.

Doubles

 Laura Golarsa /  Katarina Srebotnik defeated  Louise Pleming /  Meghann Shaughnessy, 6–4, 6–2

Entrants

Seeds

Other entrants
The following players received wildcards into the singles main draw:
  Justine Henin
  Laurence Courtois

The following players received wildcards into the doubles main draw:
  Justine Henin /  Anne Kremer

The following players received entry from the singles qualifying draw:

  Marion Maruska
  Janet Lee
  Gisela Riera
  Lubomira Bacheva

The following players received entry as lucky losers:

  Meilen Tu
  Kim Clijsters

The following players received entry from the doubles qualifying draw:

  Jane Chi /  Meilen Tu

The following players received entry as lucky losers:

  Kim Clijsters /  Nirupama Vaidyanathan

External links
 ITF tournament edition details
 Tournament draws

Flanders Women's Open
Belgian Open (tennis)
May 1999 sports events in Europe
1999 in Belgian tennis
1999 in Belgian women's sport